Akhun Kalay is a small village in Swat District of Khyber-Pakhtunkhwa. It is situated about two kilometers from Kabal chowk on Kabal-Chakdara road.

References

Populated places in Swat District